H is the eighth album by jazz keyboardist Bob James.

Track listing
All tracks composed by Bob James.
"Snowbird Fantasy" - 7:03
"Shepherd's Song" - 6:40
"Brighton by the Sea" - 5:36
"The Walkman" - 6:19
"Thoroughbred" - 7:22
"Reunited" - 5:42

Personnel 
 Bob James – acoustic piano, Fender Rhodes, Oberheim Polyphonic synthesizer, arrangements and conductor 
 Hiram Bullock – electric guitar, vocals (4)
 Bruce Dunlap – acoustic guitar solo (1), acoustic guitar (6)
 David Brown – acoustic guitar solo  (2), acoustic guitar (5)
 Gary King – bass (1, 3, 4, 6)
 Doug Stegmeyer – bass (2, 5)
 Buddy Williams – drums (1, 3, 4, 6)
 Liberty DeVitto – drums (2, 5)
 Airto Moreira – percussion (1, 6)
 Leonard "Doc" Gibbs – percussion (4)
 Ralph MacDonald – percussion (5)

Brass and Woodwinds
 Grover Washington, Jr. – soprano saxophone, tin whistle 
 Phil Bodner, Eddie Daniels, Jerry Dodgion, George Marge and Romeo Penque – woodwinds
 Paul Faulise, Jim Pugh and Barry Rogers – trombone
 Randy Brecker, Danny Cahn, Jon Faddis and Mike Lawrence – trumpet

Strings
 David Nadien – concertmaster 
 Jonathan Abramowitz and Charles McCracken – cello 
 Lamar Aslop and Al Brown – viola 
 Lewis Eley, Max Ellen, Barry Finclair, Regis Iandiorio, Marvin Morgenstern, Jan Mullen and Matthew Raimandi – violin

Production 
 Bob James – producer 
 Joe Jorgensen – associate producer, engineer
 Mark Chusid – assistant engineer
 Brian McGee – assistant engineer
 Vlado Meller – mastering 
 Marion Orr – production coordinator 
 Paula Scher – art direction, design 
 Buddy Endress – photography 
 Jim Houghton – inside photography

Studios
 Recorded at Mediasound (New York, NY).
 Mixed at Sound Mixers (New York, NY).
 Mastered at CBS Mastering Studios (New York, NY).

Charts

References

External links 
 Bob James-H at Discogs

1980 albums
Bob James (musician) albums
Albums produced by Bob James (musician)